Daniel Zovatto-Blanco (born July 12, 1991) is a Costa Rican American film and television actor. Since 2012, he has starred in films of the horror genre, Beneath (2013), It Follows (2014), and Don't Breathe (2016), as well as the romantic comedy Laggies (2014). Zovatto made his television debut in 2014, guest starring in an episode of Agents of S.H.I.E.L.D. He has since held recurring roles as Gideon LeMarchal in Revenge (2014), and Jack in Fear the Walking Dead (2016). In 2018 he appeared in one of the lead roles in HBO's Here And Now, and a year later he was cast in Penny Dreadful: City of Angels as the series protagonist, which premiered in 2020.

Early life and career 
Daniel Zovatto Blanco was born in San José, Costa Rica, on July 12, 1991; he is the son of television personality Sylvia Blanco and named after his father, Daniel Zovatto Garetto, an Argentinian politician.
Zovatto's desire to become an actor began at an early age when he joined his mother on set of her talk shows in Costa Rica, and he attributes his fascination with the horror genre to his father, who scared him as a child while he was watching Stanley Kubrick's The Shining. Subsequently, he adopted the nickname 'Danny', after the child protagonist of the horror film.
 

After moving to New York City, he pursued theater and was cast in two short films, 55 Days and The Return. He later moved to Los Angeles, where he made his feature film debut in the 2013 horror movie Beneath as Johnny. The independent film, released on May 3, 2013, was directed by Larry Fessenden and marked Zovatto's first main role in a film. Later that year, he starred as Neils Hirsch in the horror drama film Innocence, opposite Linus Roache and Stephanie March.

In 2014, Zovatto made his television debut in season one episode of Agents of S.H.I.E.L.D., "Seeds". From May to October 2014, Zovatto had a 3-episode arc in ABC's soap opera drama series Revenge. His character, Gideon LeMarchal, dates Charlotte Grayson (Christa B. Allen) in the third and fourth seasons of the series. His next film project was the romantic comedy Laggies, in the role of Junior, alongside actors including Chloë Grace Moretz, Keira Knightley, and Mark Webber. This was followed with his breakthrough role in the 2014 supernatural horror film It Follows as Greg Hannigan. The film received critical acclaim.

Zovatto played a leading role in Don't Breathe, a horror film directed by Fede Álvarez, cast as the character Money. The film premiered on March 12, 2016, at the South by Southwest film festival and was released in the USA on August 26, 2016. Although set in Detroit, it was shot primarily in Hungary, with only a few views of the Detroit ruins shot in Detroit. In 2016, Zovatto landed a recurring role on AMC's horror drama series Fear the Walking Dead, during the show's second season. Although he does not appear in the premiere episode of season two, "Monster", Jack (Zovatto) is heard conversing with Alicia Clark (Alycia Debnam-Carey) after the latter responds to his distress calls over the radio. Debnam-Carey and Zovatto's characters share a romance in the succeeding episodes "Blood in the Streets" and "Captive", despite Jack and accomplices of his having kidnapped Clark and her stepfather. The same year, he appeared in an episode of the From Dusk Til Dawn TV series as Tommy.

In 2017, Zovatto had smaller roles in film, appearing in Greta Gerwig's critically acclaimed Lady Bird, starring Saoirse Ronan, and Newness, starring Nicholas Hoult. He also appeared in an episode of Dimension 404 "Cinethrax” opposite Sarah Hyland.

Later he was cast in one of the main roles in HBO's dark comedy drama series Here And Now opposite Oscar winners Tim Robbins and Holly Hunter as Ramon, one of the adopted siblings of a multiracial family. Ramon was born in Colombia and adopted as a baby, and he is in a relationship with free-spirited Henry (Andy Bean). The family begins to struggle as Ramon starts hallucinating and seeing the figures 11:11 constantly. The series premiered in February 2018 and was canceled by HBO after 1 season.

Zovatto returned to film with two independent movies, Vandal and Heavy. Vandal is the story of Nick Cruz, also known as "Damage," a young, highly talented graffiti writer and artist struggling to justify the world of illegal graffiti as he experiences loss, love, and the consequences he created for himself. The movie premiered on March 7, 2019, at Miami Film Festival. Although the movie hasn't had a theatrical release, it received positive reviews,  and Zovatto was invited to Variety’s "10 Latinxs to Watch" brunch, held in partnership with the 36th annual Miami Film Festival, celebrating rising Latino filmmakers and actors. 

Heavy, starring Sophie Turner, is a revenge thriller set in New York. It centers on a drug-addicted, codependent couple, Maddie (Turner) and Seven (Zovatto), living it up in the high-end drug scene, leading to unavoidable tragedy. The film premiered at the Cannes Film Festival in 2019 and is set to have a worldwide theatrical release in 2020. 
  
Zovatto could not attend the ceremony because he was in Los Angeles filming John Logan's crime fantasy drama Penny Dreadful: City of Angels, where he plays the series' protagonist, Santiago "Tiago" Vega,
 a young Chicano detective struggling between two worlds: his love for his job with the LAPD and his love for his family and Mexican heritage in a brutally racist Los Angeles, 1938. Natalie Dormer stars as a demoness making racial violence worse. The series premiered in April 2020 on Showtime, and in August Showtime announced its cancelation.

He stars in the crime movie Flinch. Flinch is the story of Joe Doyle (played by Zovatto), a young hitman who develops feelings for Mia (played by Tilda Hervey), who witnesses a murder he committed.

Filmography

References

External links 

1991 births
Male actors from San José, Costa Rica
American male television actors
American male film actors
Living people
21st-century American male actors
Costa Rican people of Italian descent
Costa Rican emigrants to the United States
Costa Rican male film actors
Costa Rican male television actors